State Trooper is an American crime drama set in the American West of the 1950s, starring Rod Cameron as Lt. Rod Blake, an officer/chief investigator of the Nevada Department of Public Safety. The series aired 104 episodes in syndication from 1956 to 1959.

Overview
State Trooper is based in Las Vegas, Reno, and Carson City, Nevada, but was filmed by Revue Studios at Iverson Movie Ranch in Chatsworth in Los Angeles County in California. Its fictional stories focus upon miners, ranchers, dude ranches, released convicts, and murder mysteries, often with surprise endings.

The series pilot entitled "Killer on a Horseback" starring Rod Cameron aired in February 1956 on an episode of the NBC anthology series Star Stage.

Robert Armstrong appeared in 24 episodes as Sheriff Andy Anderson, who developed a good working relationship with Cameron's character, Blake. Don Haggerty played Sheriff Elder in nine episodes in the 1956-1957 season. Paul Stader appeared five times in the 1958-1959 season as Deputy Sheriff Jim Wallace. Tom Greenway appeared in four episodes as Sheriff Bronson: "Stay Lost, Little Girl", "Dangerous Honeymoon", "Full Circle", and "Death on Wheels".

Blake carried a "Detective Special" revolver.

Episodes

Season 1 (1956–57)

Season 2 (1957–58)

Season 3: 1959

Guest stars

Claude Akins
Jack Albertson
Merry Anders
Raymond Bailey
Barbara Bain
Herschel Bernardi
Amanda Blake
Whitney Blake
Jean Byron
James Coburn
Miriam Colon 
Mike Connors
Russ Conway
Dabbs Greer
Frank De Vol
Angie Dickinson
Mason Alan Dinehart
Richard Farnsworth
Frank Ferguson
Constance Ford 
Beverly Garland
Vivi Janiss
Carolyn Jones
DeForest Kelley
Jack Kelly
Wright King
Michael Landon
Joyce Meadows
Burt Mustin
Jeanette Nolan 
Denver Pyle 
Gloria Saunders
Vito Scotti
Robert F. Simon
Olan Soule
Craig Stevens
Hope Summers
Nita Talbot
Constance Towers
Lee Van Cleef
Robert Vaughn
John Vivyan

Home media
Timeless Media Group released the complete first season on DVD in Region 1 on December 14, 2010. The complete second and third seasons were released together in a six-disc set on December 13, 2011.

On September 23, 2014, Timeless Media Group released State Trooper - The Complete Series on DVD in Region 1.  The 11-disc set contains all 104 episodes of the series.

References

External links 
 

1956 American television series debuts
1959 American television series endings
1950s American crime drama television series
Television series set in the 1950s
Black-and-white American television shows
English-language television shows
First-run syndicated television programs in the United States
Television shows set in Nevada
Television series by Universal Television
1950s Western (genre) television series